Kuvâ-yi Seyyâre, also known as the Green Army Society (Turkish: Yeşil Ordu Cemiyeti) or the People's Branch (Turkish: Halk Zümresi) was a force of Circassian and Abkhazian volunteers led by Çerkes Ethem against the allied invasion forces during the Turkish War of Independence. The group saw themselves as a force to fight against "those who caused disturbance to the greater good of Anatolia". The forces put down several rebellions and played a big role in significantly slowing down the Greek army during the Greco-Turkish War (1919-1922). In time, as Ethem's Islamic Socialist views clashed with the Turkism-nationalism of Mustafa Kemal's Turkish National movement, he eventually cut ties with them, and was declared a traitor due to clashes with İsmet İnönü.

History 
Kuvâ-yi Seyyâre, founded by Ethem Dipsheu, was the only semi-organized military force in Anatolia during 1919–1920 period between the Armistice of Mudros and the Treaty of Sèvres.

After the Greek landing at Symrna, Ethem made the following declaration, effectively starting his resistance:

He then declared a holy war against oppression, and invited all Circassians to fight for his cause. After that, he coordinated his military operations with Ali Fuat Pasha in Ankara and fought against the invading Greek armies with his cavalry. He was instrumental in putting down various rebellions against the authority of the Grand National Assembly of Turkey. 

Eventually, Çerkes Ethem had disagreements with İsmet İnönü, refusing to join his forces with the regular army established under his command, as he would be a regular soldier as well. Ethem claimed that his soldiers were made up of Circassians and mountain clans, so they would never obey anyone other than him, and he would have to be given the rank of commander in the army. Although Mustafa Kemal had a positive view of Ethem, İsmet Pasha disliked him, and so the newly reconstituted Turkish Army had to put down Ethem's forces whilst also fighting the Greeks at First Battle of İnönü. While Ethem's forces were clashing with Greeks, the Turkish army arrived, and Ethem, stuck between two hostile armies, made a non-aggression pact with the Greeks and fled Anatolia. İsmet İnönü later claimed that Ethem subsequently cooperated with the Greek army, which has been disputed and rejected by most historians.  This resulted in Ethem's citizenship getting revoked on the grounds of treason and his being declared persona non grata by the TBMM, amongst many others. From Greece, he went to Jordan and settled there. Ethem was later personally forgiven by Atatürk, but he rejected to return and died in Amman, Jordan.

Notes

References 

Militias in Asia
Islamic socialism
Militias in Europe
Turkish War of Independence
Circassians
Socialism in the Ottoman Empire
Socialism in Turkey
Anti-imperialism in Asia
Anti-imperialism in Europe